New Norfolk High School is a government co-educational comprehensive secondary school located in , Tasmania, Australia. The school caters for approximately 350 students from Years 7 to 12 and is administered by the Tasmanian Department of Education.

In 2019 student enrolments were 314. The school principal is Adam Potito.

See also 
 List of schools in Tasmania
 Education in Tasmania

References

External links 
 New Norfolk High School website

Public high schools in Tasmania